National Highway 354, commonly referred to as NH 354 is a national highway in India. It is a spur road of National Highway 54 under Bharatmala in the state of Panjab in India.

Route 
Gurdaspur – Kalanaur – Dera Baba Nanak – Ajnala - Raja Sansi – Amritsar - Chabhal-Bhikhiwind – Khem Karan Makhu– Arifke – Ferozpur -Jhok Sarkari – Sadiq – Sri Muktsar Sahib – Malout.

Junctions  

   in Gurdaspur
   in Amritsar
   in Bhikhiwind
     in Arifke
          in Ferozpur
   in Sri Muktsar Sahib
   in Malout

See also 
 List of National Highways in India
 List of National Highways in India by state

References

External links 
 NH 354 on OpenStreetMap

National highways in India
National Highways in Punjab, India